John Hipperon (died 1440 or after), of Guildford, Surrey, was an English politician and lawyer.

He was a Member (MP) of the Parliament of England for Guildford in March 1416 and 1422.

References

14th-century births
15th-century deaths
English MPs March 1416
Members of Parliament for Guildford
English MPs 1422